Bloomfield Township, Kansas may refer to:

 Bloomfield Township, Mitchell County, Kansas
 Bloomfield Township, Sheridan County, Kansas

See also 
 List of Kansas townships
 Bloomfield Township (disambiguation)

Kansas township disambiguation pages